Freestyle Boardin' '99, known in Japan as , and in Europe as Phat Air: Extreme Snowboarding, is a snowboarding video game developed by Atelier Double for Sega Saturn and PlayStation in 1997-1999. It is the sequel to Zap! Snowboarding Trix.

Reception

The PlayStation version received unfavorable reviews according to the review aggregation website GameRankings. In Japan, Famitsu gave it a score of 27 out of 40 for the same PlayStation version, and 25 out of 40 for the Saturn version.

References

External links
 

1997 video games
Atelier Double games
Capcom games
Multiplayer and single-player video games
PlayStation (console) games
Pony Canyon games
Sega Saturn games
Snowboarding video games
Video game sequels
Video games developed in Japan